Günter Habig (born 7 December 1964) is a retired German football forward. He is the son of Ernst-Günter Habig.

References

External links
 

1964 births
Living people
German footballers
VfL Bochum players
Alemannia Aachen players
2. Bundesliga players
Association football forwards